The Play on One (Play on One in the final series) is a British television drama anthology series, produced by the BBC Nations and Regions in its studios outside London, and transmitted on BBC1 from 1988 to 1991.

Plays

References

External links

1980s British drama television series
1990s British drama television series
1988 British television series debuts
1991 British television series endings
BBC television dramas
1980s British anthology television series
1990s British anthology television series
English-language television shows